Eric Turner (born November 1, 1977) is an American singer and songwriter who currently resides in Sweden. He is best known for being featured on the song "Written in the Stars" with Tinie Tempah.  He has had standout success as a songwriter, with three separate #1s and a number No. 1 on beatport. He has collaborated with artists including Avicii, Lupe Fiasco, John De Sohn, Ella, Inna, Lawson, Kardinall Offishal, Tinie Tempah, Professor Green, Tinchy Stryder, and Sebjak. He has one song on Avicii's album Stories. He is also the lead singer in the band Street Fighting Man. Songs he has written have reached a wide audience and together have an estimated 3-400 million views on YouTube.

Background
Turner was born in Boston, and attended Boston College High School. He was a math teacher at the International English School Stockholm, Järfälla in Sweden. He attended McGill University in Canada, where he completed a master's degree in biochemistry. Turner is also an accomplished visual artist.

Turner has two brothers, Nicholas and Robert, and a sister, Destinee Turner, who live in Boston. His mother teaches fashion design at Quincy High School.

Music career
Turner's performance with his band Street Fighting Man at an event in Stockholm caught the attention of a local sound engineer, who later told his friend, Swedish producer Eshraque "iSHi" Mughal, about the singer: "This guy is freakin amazing! you have to hear this guy." ISHi met him and decided straight away that he had the "X-factor", signing Turner to his music publishing company 2Stripes a few weeks later.

As a talented songwriter as well as singer, Turner began writing pop songs for other artists.  "Written in the Stars" was one of the first pop songs he wrote, and became a song for Tinie Tempah with Turner singing the big chorus. The song was released in September 2010 and peaked at number 1 in both Ireland and the United Kingdom. The song peaked at number 12 on the Billboard Hot 100.

Turner also appeared on Lupe Fiasco's album Break the Chain. Turner made appearances on the songs "Stereo Sun" and "My Last Try" from Tinchy Stryder's third studio album, Third Strike.  The album's lead single, "Angels & Stars", features Lupe Fiasco and Tinie Tempah. It was leaked on January 18, 2012, and was released to pop & rhythm radio station on January 31, 2012. The album's second single, "Stylechanger" (featuring Kardinal Offishall, Wretch 32 and Professor Green), was released via download on February 24, 2012. "Written in the Stars 2.0", a track which was suspected to appear on the album, was leaked online in January 2012.

In early 2013, Turner released a mixtape titled StyleChanger. It included the songs "Written in the Stars 2.0", "StyleChanger" (main track), "Stereo Sun Part 2", "Pretenders", "Old Soul", "Dream On" and "Waves of You". All were written by Turner.

Turner has since collaborated with Avicii on the song "Dancing in My Head", and also co-wrote Tinie Tempah's song, "Someday (Place in the Sun)".

Turner is a well known songwriter and has written songs for big artists. He wrote two songs for the band Lawson, "Learn to Love Again" and "Juliet". He has one song on Avicii's new album Stories, "Broken Arrows". Turner also wrote and featured in Inna's song "Bop Bop".  He wrote and featured on Sebjak's single "Fire Higher".

Discography

Singles

Main artist

Featured artist

Guest appearances

References

External links
 Eric Turner's Twitter

 Eric Turner Facebook

1977 births
American emigrants to Sweden
English-language singers from Sweden
Living people
Singers from Massachusetts
Boston College High School alumni
McGill University Faculty of Science alumni
American male pianists
21st-century American singers
21st-century Swedish singers
21st-century American pianists
21st-century American male singers